Otto Karl Friedrich Schoetensack (12 July 1850 in Stendal – 23 December 1912 in Ospedaletti) was a German industrialist and later professor of anthropology, having retired from the chemical firm which he had founded.  During a 1908 archeological dig, he oversaw the worker Daniel Hartmann who found the lower jaw of a hominid, the oldest human fossil then known, which Schoetensack later described formally as Homo heidelbergensis.

Publications

"Der Unterkiefer des Homo heidelbergensis aus den Sanden von Mauer bei Heidelberg" (The lower jaw of the Homo heidelbergensis out of the sands of Mauer near Heidelberg). 1908. Leipzig: Wilhelm Engelmann.

External links
Biography (in German).
 
 

1850 births
1912 deaths
German paleoanthropologists
German anthropologists
People from the Province of Saxony
People from Stendal